Karen Fraser (born 4 December 1959) is a Canadian volleyball player. She competed in the women's tournament at the 1984 Summer Olympics.

References

External links
 

1959 births
Living people
Canadian women's volleyball players
Olympic volleyball players of Canada
Volleyball players at the 1984 Summer Olympics
Sportspeople from Halifax, Nova Scotia